Filippo "Philip" Buccola (August 6, 1886-October, 1987) was an Italian-American mobster. He was also a professional boxing manager. Buccola belonged to what later on became known as the Patriarca crime family, based in Boston Massachusetts.

Biography
Buccola was born in Palermo, Sicily, Italy. Buccola immigrated to the United States at age 32. He was the boss of the later-to-be-known as the Patriarca crime family after the retirement of previous boss Gaspare Messina, with Joe Lombardo (not to be confused with the Chicago Outfit member of the same name) acting as his underboss. During 1954 and under pressure from U.S. government agencies, Buccola returned to Sicily, turning over leadership of his crime family to Ray Patriarca, leading to the renaming of the family to the "Patriarca" crime family.

Death
Buccola died aged 101, in his birth-place city of Palermo.

References

1886 births
1987 deaths
American gangsters of Sicilian descent
People from Boston
American crime bosses
Italian crime bosses
People from Palermo
Boxing managers
Patriarca crime family
Italian emigrants to the United States